The 1988 New England Patriots season was the franchise's 19th season in the National Football League, the 29th overall and the 5th under head coach Raymond Berry. With a record of nine wins and seven losses, they finished tied for second in the AFC East Division. It would take until 1994 for the Patriots to record another winning season. The Patriots improved on its 8–7 record from 1987, winning one more game due to one game being cancelled the previous season. Despite the winning record, the Patriots did not reach the postseason. They finished tied for 2nd in the AFC East with the arch rival Colts, but were relegated to 3rd place because the Colts had a better record against common opponents than the Patriots did.

Offseason

NFL Draft

Personnel

Staff

Roster

Regular season

Schedule

Note: Intra-division opponents are in bold text.

Game summaries

Week 5

Standings

See also
New England Patriots seasons

References

New England Patriots
New England Patriots seasons
New England Patriots
Sports competitions in Foxborough, Massachusetts